The All Wales Convention was set up by Rhodri Morgan, the First Minister and Ieuan Wyn Jones, the Deputy First Minister of the Welsh Government, to educate the public about the current system of government in Wales and to promote a debate throughout Wales on the National Assembly for Wales’ current devolution settlement and whether there should be a referendum on moving to primary law-making powers.

The convention was chaired by Sir Emyr Jones Parry.

The All Wales Convention reported its findings to the First Minister, Rhodri Morgan, on 18 November 2009.

The convention recommended that a referendum be held on giving the Welsh Assembly full law-making powers. Polling by the convention found that 47% would vote "yes" and 37% "no", leading the convention to claim that a yes result would be obtainable. The convention also recommended that a poll be held before June 2010, and said a full law-making Assembly would be better than the current system.

The All Wales Convention also found that the current 60 members could handle the additional work that would come from further powers and there should be no increase in members as a result of more powers.

See also 
2011 Welsh devolution referendum

References

External links 
 The Convention's website

Senedd
2009 in politics
2009 in Wales
2009 works
Political history of Wales
Welsh Government
Public policy in Wales
Welsh Labour
Plaid Cymru
Welsh devolution
Public consultations